Amelanchier asiatica, commonly known as Korean juneberry or Asian serviceberry, is a species in the genus Amelanchier, native to China, Japan, and Korea.

References

External links
 

asiatica
Plants described in 1839